Axial Seamount (also Coaxial Seamount or Axial Volcano) is a seamount and submarine volcano in the Pacific Ocean, located on the Juan de Fuca Ridge, approximately  west of Cannon Beach, Oregon. Located at the center of both a geological hotspot and a mid-ocean ridge, the seamount is geologically complex, and its origins are still poorly understood. Axial Seamount is set on a long, low-lying plateau, with two large rift zones trending  to the northeast and southwest of its center.

Axial Seamount was first detected in the 1970s by satellite altimetry, and mapped and explored by Pisces IV, DSV Alvin, and others through the 1980s. A large package of sensors was dropped on the seamount through 1992, and the New Millennium Observatory was established on its flanks in 1996. Axial Seamount received significant scientific attention following the seismic detection of a submarine eruption at the volcano in January 1998, the first time a submarine eruption had been detected and followed in situ. Axial Seamount erupted again in April 2011, producing a mile-wide lava flow. There was another eruption in 2015.

Geology

Tectonic setting 

Axial Seamount is the youngest volcano and current eruptive center of the Cobb–Eickelberg Seamount chain, a chain of seamounts that terminates south of Alaska. It is a product of the Cobb hotspot, but now sits on an ocean spreading center between the Juan de Fuca Plate and the North American Plate, offset by the Blanco Fracture Zone to the south and a ridge-built triple junction to the north.

This position is not yet entirely understood. It is believed that the chain, formed over millions of years by the now-inactive Cobb hotspot, is older than the mid-ocean ridge it bisects. However some scientists have questioned this theory, pointing out that the high density of the chain's overlapping seamounts is incompatible with such an origin, as a hotspot would form a well organized, widely spaced chain. Although the exact nature of Axial Seamount remains unknown, its complex origins makes it one of the most geologically interesting features in the North Pacific.

Structure 

Axial Seamount is the most active volcanic site in the North Pacific. Study of magnetic delineations along the seamount have modeled the ridge's history up to 30 million years ago, and shown that growth has progressed mostly in the north, with some southward progression dating back 3.5 million years. The base of Axial Seamount is a long, low-lying plateau, and the eastern part of the seamount is defined by a series of linear scarps. Basins around the volcano increase its irregularity, making it unusually complex (most seamounts of roughly the same size are circular or flattened in shape.)

Axial Seamount's summit is marked by an unusual rectangular caldera,  in area, ~3° in slope, and breached on the southeast side. The caldera is roughly  deeper at the north side than it is in the south. Flows within the caldera consist mostly of sheet flows pocketed by lava ponds and pit craters. Less common are pillow lavas; their arrangement along the caldera walls suggests that they were an important component in the volcano's early growth.

The area contains high amounts of volcanic glass; a major eruption is still visible in the form of an elongated glassy lava flow extending off the caldera wall, east of the main rift line. Dives in 1983 found extensive low-temperature venting at the northern half of the fissure. The shorter, newer southern rift zone consists of a topographically plunging rift, surrounding by subtle, discontinuous faults. Camera tows along the southern flank reveal that the area is built of delineated sheet flows, small lava ponds, and lava channels.

The youngest of the flows on Axial Seamount are aligned along the two rift zones, followed by flows inside the summit caldera; the oldest appear to originate from directly around the caldera, where most of the basalt is completely covered in accumulated sediment. This suggests a bilateral growth pattern, a trend also found in Hawaiian volcanics and other well-known seamounts, for instance Jasper Seamount.

Axial Seamount's growth has intersected the growth of many of the smaller seamounts around it. The largest of these is Brown Bear Seamount, to which it is connected by a narrow ridge running roughly perpendicular to its western caldera wall. However, little evidence of interactions between the two seamounts has been found. Interactions with Cobb Seamount to the north are more complex, forming an unusual "bent spreading center." In addition there are four smaller structures directly east, north, and south of Axial.

History

Early history

The first volcanoes along the Juan de Fuca ridge, including Axial Seamount, were detected in the 1970s by satellite altimetry. Axial Seamount's proximity to the western coast and shallow depth make it one of the most easily accessible seamounts in the world, and its unique geological setting and active state also makes it one of the most interesting, rivaling Davidson Seamount to the south in scientific interest.

The survey was specifically meant to find and link seafloor hydrothermal activity to geomorphic features. Four areas of increased temperature concentration, indicative of hydrothermal activity were found, and the then-unnamed Axial Seamount was among them. Submersible dives with Pisces IV and DSV Alvin in 1983 and 1984 discovered the first active black smoker vents in the north Pacific. Soon after Axial Seamount was named for its central position on the intersection of the Cobb–Eickelberg Seamount chain and Juan de Fuca Ridge. That same year, the National Oceanic and Atmospheric Administration (NOAA) founded its VENTS program, providing impetus for studying the volcano more closely.

Between 1987 and 1992, a variety of pressure sensors, tilt sensors, temperature probes, and seismometers were dropped on the volcano in what came to be known as the Volcanic Systems Moninters (VSN). Also in 1996, the New Millennium Observatory (NeMO) was established on Axial Seamount, to study volcanic perturbations and the effect they have on hydrothermal communities.

1998 eruption 

The 1998 eruption of Axial Seamount was preceded by several large earthquake swarms, common indicators of volcanic activity. In 1991, the National Oceanic and Atmospheric Administration (NOAA) was granted access to the United States Navy's SOSUS system, a chain of submerged hydrophones in the North Pacific originally used by the Navy to detect Russian submarines during the Cold War. Since 1993, the NOAA has maintained a real-time monitoring system that alerts the organization whenever an event occurs. The hydrophones are able to detect even very small earthquakes (~ magnitude 1.8) by listening for the acoustic waves generated by T-waves. These waves can propagate over large distances with minimal loss in power, making them an ideal way to record otherwise unnoticeable submarine earthquakes; over the course of the eruption, only 3 earthquakes were strong enough to register on land-based systems. However, they cannot interpret earthquake depth or what caused them.

Between 1991 and 1996 Axial Seamount experienced a single earthquake swarm of over 50 events. Between May and November 1997 this activity increased markedly, with SOSUS recording 5 such swarms, culminating with a massive 11-day, 8247-quake event around the time of the eruption, in January 1998. This coincided with lava release along the summit and southern flank. The seamount remained absolutely quiet thereafter, suggesting the completion of an eruptive cycle at the volcano. In all, 9055 earthquakes were detected, and 1669 were strong enough to be located. Earthquake activity was concentrated around the summit and southern rift zones, with the majority of events centered inside the summit caldera; temperature probes and pressure recorders in the caldera recorded an average  increase and  height deflation, respectively, during the event. This close monitoring gives the 1998 eruption the distinction of being the only submarine eruption ever observed in situ.

In July DSV Alvin made several dives on the seamount's summit caldera, followed in August through September by an extensive observation and collection program using ROV ROPOS, confirming the bathymetric estimates.

The development, eruption, and close monitoring of Axial Seamount provided a fertile model on submarine volcanic eruptions to scientists; several scientific papers on the topic were published soon after.

2011 eruption 
Seismic activity at Axial Seamount virtually disappeared after the 1998 eruption, and monitoring of the volcano was done principally with bottom pressure recorders deployed on the volcano's flanks, supplemented since 2000 by annual measurements using pressure sensors mounted on Remotely operated underwater vehicles (ROVs) and applied to local benchmarks. In eight years Axial Seamount recovered approximately 50% of its  of pre-eruption swelling, and in 2006, William Chadwick of the Oregon State University and his associates calculated that the next eruption would occur in approximately 2014:

In July 2011, a dive using ROV Jason discovered new lava flows on the volcanoes that had not been present a year before. The expeditionary crew recovered two bottom-pressure recorders and two hydrophones (a third was found buried in lava) off the volcano, which together showed that the eruption had occurred during April, starting on 6 April 2011. Although the instruments recorded hundreds of seismic events, only a handful had been noticed by SOSUS and land-based seismometers, as many components of the system had been offline at the time.

Ecology 

In 1983, a Canadian–American collaborative expedition, named the Canadian American Seamount (CASM) expedition, visited the northwestern edge of Axial Seamount's summit caldera to investigate a persistent temperature anomaly in the region. In a series of eight dives conducted by Pisces IV, the scientists discovered a vibrant hydrothermal vent community on the leading edge of a  fissure within the caldera. Camera tows and submersible dives through the 1980s and 1990s revealed Axial Seamount's active state, including the only known black smoker in the northwest Pacific. Three venting centers have been recognized: the original site, named CHASM; a southwestern caldera field discovered in the late 1980s, named ASHES; and a site located on its southeastern rift zone, named CASTLE. All primarily emit sulfur and sulfides.

The temperature and composition of Axial Seamount's hydrothermal vents changes over time, but always maintains a roughly common identity, as do the vents' individual microbial communities. Vents generally have a lower pH than the surrounding fluid, and are acidic and alkaline as a result. Curiously, vent fluid are heavily enriched in helium, containing five times the amount of the element as similar vents in the Galápagos, and 580 times that of regular seawater.

The three most common microbial groups are bacterial Campylobacterota, Methanococcaceae, and Euryarchaeota family. The most common flora at Axial Seamount's hydrothermal vents is the worm Ridgeia piscesae, which is found at hydrothermal sites of all descriptions on the Juan de Fuca ridge, and is the base of Axial Seamount's hydrothermal ecosystem. Other species on the seamount include the tube worm P. palmiformis, the sea snail Lepetodrilus fucensis, the bristle worm Amphisamytha galapagensis, and the sea spider Sericosura verenae.

See also 

Davidson Seamount
Geology of the Pacific Northwest

Notes

References

External links 

NeMO at Axial—homepage of New Millennium Observatory at Axial Seamount.
Castle Vent at Axial Seamount—video tour of Castle Vent, one of the hydrothermal vents on Axial Seamount.

Ridge volcanoes
Hotspot volcanoes
Active volcanoes
Seamounts of the Cobb–Eickelberg Seamount chain
Polygenetic volcanoes
Articles containing video clips